Dalaman Airport  is an international airport and one of three serving south-west Turkey, the others being Milas–Bodrum Airport and Antalya Airport. It has two terminals. The old terminal is used for domestic flights and the new terminal is for international flights. The airport serves the surrounding tourist areas and environs of Dalaman. Flights are available to and from over 120 destinations, across the rest of Turkey, Europe, North Africa and the Middle East.

History
The construction of Dalaman airport was begun in 1976, and it opened in 1981 as an aerodrome. In 1989, it was promoted to airport status. The airport extends over an area of 6.15 million m2.

The new Dalaman International Terminal cost approximately $150,000,000 to complete and is the third-largest terminal building in Turkey. It was designed by renowned architect Emre Arolat, whose other projects include the award-winning Sancaklar Mosque.  The terminal features 12 boarding gates, eight with covered airbridges. The apron was also re-designed, increasing space for remote stands. Consequently, the airport has the capacity to handle up to 35 flights at any one time. In total, the terminal now has a floor space of 95,000m2, compared with less than 45,000m2 prior to refurbishment. Check-in and departures are based on the upper two levels, with arrivals using the lower two levels. The old terminal building is still in use and operated as the domestic terminal.

Airlines and destinations

Statistics

Ground transport
Shuttle services are available to Marmaris or Fethiye and Menteşe (central district of Muğla) along Marmaris and Fethiye. These services from the airport are mostly dependent on the arrival of domestic flights. Passengers from foreign flights generally use transfers or taxis. Parking facilities are available for up to 550 vehicles outside the terminal building.

References

External links

Airports in Turkey
Buildings and structures in Muğla Province
Transport in Muğla Province